The Interliga was an international professional ice hockey league which existed between 1999 and 2007. It was formed in 1999 to replace the Alpine League after Hungarian teams took over the Italian contingency and the base of the league shifted away from the Alps.

During its existence there were teams from Austria, Croatia, Hungary, Poland, Serbia, Slovakia and Slovenia.

Results

See also
 Alpenliga

References
 Interliga 1999./2000.
 Interliga 2000./01.
 Interliga 2001./02.
 Interliga 2002./03.
 Interliga 2003./04.
 Interliga 2004./05.
 Interliga 2005./06.
 Interliga 2006./07.

 
Defunct multi-national ice hockey leagues in Europe
Ice hockey leagues in Austria
Ice hockey leagues in Hungary
Ice hockey leagues in Slovenia
Ice hockey leagues in Serbia
Ice hockey leagues in Croatia
Ice hockey leagues in Poland
Sports leagues established in 1999
1999 establishments in Europe
2007 disestablishments in Europe
Sports leagues disestablished in 2007